Parra is a Spanish and Portuguese surname.

Parra may also refer to:

Places
 Cruz de la Parra, the oldest artifact connected with Columbus to be found on the American continent, located in Baracoa, Cuba
 La Parra, a municipality in the province of Badajoz, Extremadura, Spain
 Parra, Goa, a village in the Bardez sub-district of Goa, India
 Local slang for Parramatta, a major suburb in Sydney, Australia

Other uses
 Parra letters, used in Colonial orthography for Mayan languages

See also
 Para (disambiguation)